Agustina of Aragon (Spanish:Agustina de Aragón) is a 1929 Spanish silent historical film directed by Florián Rey. It portrays the story of Agustina of Aragon, the heroine of the Spanish War of Independence against Napoleon. Another film portrayal of her Agustina of Aragon was released in 1950.

Cast
 Santiago Aguilar 
 José María Alonso Pesquera 
 Adolfo Bernáldez 
 María Luz Callejo 
 Fernando Fernández de Córdoba 
 Alfredo Hurtado 
 José María Jimeno 
 Ramón Meca 
 Jesús Peña 
 Carlos Rufart 
 Manuel San Germán 
 Alfonso Solá 
 Marina Torres

References

Bibliography
 Klossner, Michael. The Europe of 1500-1815 on Film and Television: A Worldwide Filmography of Over 2550 Works, 1895 Through 2000. McFarland & Company, 2002.

External links

1929 films
1920s historical films
Spanish historical films
Spanish silent films
Films directed by Florián Rey
Films set in the 19th century